The International Hospitality Review is a biannual peer-reviewed academic journal covering the hospitality and tourism fields. It is published by the Florida International University School of Hospitality & Tourism Management. The editor-in-chief is Jinlin Zhao.

References

External links 
 

Hospitality management
Florida International University
Business and management journals
Publications established in 1983
Biannual journals
English-language journals
1983 establishments in Florida